Lighthouse Point Shell Ring (38CH12), also known as Parrot's Point Shell Ring, is a historic mound located on James Island, Charleston County, South Carolina. It is one of 20 or more prehistoric shell rings located from the central coast of South Carolina to the central coast of Georgia. The midden contains a diverse array of biota.

It was listed on the National Register of Historic Places in 1990.

References

Archaeological sites on the National Register of Historic Places in South Carolina
Buildings and structures in Charleston County, South Carolina
National Register of Historic Places in Charleston County, South Carolina
Shell rings